WCBQ (1340 AM) is a radio station broadcasting a Gospel format. Licensed to Oxford, North Carolina, United States.  The station is currently owned by The Paradise Network.

External links

CBQ